Bacchus Marsh Football and Netball Club is an Australian rules football and netball club, located in Bacchus Marsh in Victoria, Australia. The football squad competes in the Ballarat Football League, which is part of the Victorian Country Football League.

The home ground of Bacchus Marsh is Maddingley Park, located to the south of Bacchus Marsh.

History
The club was originally two clubs: the Bacchus Marsh Tigers who wore a black guernsey with a yellow strip going diagonally from top left to bottom right, and the Maddingley Spiders who wore a black guernsey with a red strip going diagonally from top left to bottom right.

In 1978 Maddingley left the Ballarat-Bacchus Marsh FL and joined the Ballarat Football League. Bacchus Marsh remained in the B-BMFL and struggled because the club was practically insolvent.  At the end of the season a deal was done and the two clubs merged.

The two teams merged in 1979 to form Maddingley-Bacchus Marsh FC who now wear a black guernsey with two "v" shape strips, one red, one yellow starting at the top left and finishing on the top right. The team changed their name to the Bacchus Marsh FC in 1983.

There have been a few great footballers to go through the district including, Fred Wooller, Sandy Talbot, Frank Pomeroy, and Liam Duggan.

Premierships
Bacchus Marsh - 1920, 1924, 1925, 1928, 1933, 1937, 1940, 1941, 1962, 1974.
Maddingley - 1914, 1936, 1951, 1954, 1958, 1967, 1968, 1973, 1977.

Ballarat Football League
2016

Henderson Medal winners
1997 - Wayne Cracknell
2018 - Daniel Burton

Tony Lockett Medal winners
1987 - M.Scott (69 goals), 
1990 - M.Scott (79), 
1991 - R.Maguire (82), 
1998 - Brendan Hehir (74), 
2000 - Chris Stuldreier (93), 
2001 - Chris Stuldreier (88)

VFL/AFL players
Harry Vallence - 
Keith Shea -  and 
Fred Wooller  -  
Bill Closter - Footscray
Wayne Closter - 
Nick Suban - 
Liam Duggan -

External links
Official Site

Book
History of Football in the Ballarat District  by John Stoward - 

Bacchus Marsh
Bacchus Marsh
1979 establishments in Australia
Australian rules football clubs in Victoria (Australia)
B